Reistad is a small village in Lier municipality in Buskerud, Norway. Its population in 1999 was 554, and since 2001 has considered a part of the urban area of Lierbyen.

References

Villages in Buskerud
Lier, Norway